Richard Boswell "Bos" Murphy (14 February 1924 – 9 November 2000) was a New Zealand professional welter/middle/light heavyweight boxer of the 1940s and 1950s who won the New Zealand Boxing Association welterweight title, Australasian welterweight title, and British Empire middleweight title.

Murphy died at Silverstream in 2000 and was buried at Akatarawa Cemetery.

Professional boxing record

References

External links
Photograph of Bos Murphy

1924 births
2000 deaths
Light-heavyweight boxers
Middleweight boxers
Sportspeople from Palmerston North
Welterweight boxers
Burials at Akatarawa Cemetery
New Zealand male boxers
Commonwealth Boxing Council champions